In linguistics, an echo answer or echo response is a way of answering a polar question without using words for yes and no.  The verb used in the question is simply echoed in the answer, negated if the answer has a negative truth-value.  For example:

 "Did you go to the cinema?" (or "Didn't you go to the cinema?")
 "I did not." or "I didn't go."

Finnish

The Finnish language is one language that employs echo answers in response to yes-no questions.  It does not answer them with either adverbs or interjections.  So the answer to "Tuletteko kaupungista?" ("Are you coming from town?") is the verb form itself, "Tulemme" ("We are coming."). Negatively phrased questions are answered similarly.  Negative answers use the negative verb en in coordination with the infinitive. The negative answer to "Tunnetteko herra Lehdon?" ("Do you know Mr Lehto?") is "En tunne" ("I don't know.") or simply "En" ("I don't.").

Celtic languages

The Celtic languages also primarily employ echo answers. Irish and Scottish Gaelic lack the words "yes" and "no" altogether. In Welsh, the words for "yes" and "no" ("ie" and "nage") are restricted to specialized circumstances. Like Finnish, the main way in these languages to state yes or no, to answer yes-no questions, is to echo the verb of the question. In Irish, the question "An dtiocfaidh tú?" ("Will you come?") will be answered with "Tiocfad" ("I will come") or "Ní thiocfad" ("I will not come"). (In Hiberno-English, it is the auxiliary that is echoed: the English question "Will you come?" is often answered in Ireland with "I will" instead of "Yes" or "I will not" instead of "no".)

Similarly, in Welsh, the answers to "Ydy Fred yn dod?" ("Is Fred coming?") are "Ydy" ("He is") or "Nag ydy" ("He is not"). In general, the negative answer is the positive answer combined with "nag". As in Finnish, it avoids the issue of what an unadorned "yes" means in response to a negative question. A "yes" response to the question "You don't beat your wife?" is ambiguous in English, but the Welsh response "nag ydw" has no ambiguity.

Latin

Although Latin has words or phrases that can stand in for "yes" and "no", it also employs echo answers. Echo answers would be the more common and neutral response:
 Nōnne Sextus molestus discipulus est?
 "Sextus is an annoying student, isn't he?"
 Est.
 "He is."
 Num Sextus litterās memoriā tenēre potest?
 "Sextus cannot remember the alphabet, can he?"
 Nōn potest.
 "He cannot."

Portuguese

The Portuguese language is the only major Romance language to use echo answers often, even though it has words for "yes" and "no" proper (sim and não respectively) as well. Portuguese will most commonly answer a polar question in the affirmative by repeating the main verb.

For example, one would answer the question, "Tens fome?" ("Are you hungry?" literally, "Do you have hunger?") by simply replying, "tenho" ("I have"). One could also add sim before or after the verb for the use of emphasis or to contradict a negative question, producing "sim, tenho" or "tenho sim". To produce a negative answer to a polar question, the verb is repeated followed by não before or after it. Thus, a negative answer to our above question would be: "Não tenho," "Tenho não" or "Não tenho fome." For emphasis, one could even say, "Não tenho, não."

Chinese

Chinese languages often employ echo answers. Often, yes-no questions in Mandarin are expressed in the A-not-A form, and are answered with either A or not-A.
For example, where Q stands for question, A for affirmative, and N for negative:

In addition, yes-no questions are often formed by adding the particle "吗" (ma for "yes or no?") to the end of a sentence, in which case the answer can be "是的" (shì de for "is (so)") or "不是" (bu shì for "not is (so)"), or "对" (duì for "right") or "不对" (bu duì for "not right"):

See also 

 Yes–no question
 Yes and no

References 

Grammar
Human communication